Lobo Canyon is a census-designated place (CDP) in Cibola County, New Mexico, United States. It was first listed as a CDP prior to the 2020 census.

It is along New Mexico State Road 547 in a valley called Lobo Canyon, at the base of La Jara Mesa.

Demographics

References 

Census-designated places in Cibola County, New Mexico
Census-designated places in New Mexico